The term seven hills of Seattle refers unofficially to the hills the U.S. city was built on and around, though there is no consensus on exactly which hills it refers to. The term has been used to refer to several other cities, most notably Rome and Constantinople.

The seven hills
Walt Crowley considered the main candidates for the seven hills to be:
 First Hill, nicknamed "Pill Hill" because of the many hospitals and clinics located there
 Yesler Hill – presently Yesler Terrace
 Cherry Hill — located to the east of First Hill (previously called Second Hill or Renton Hill – both these names have passed out of common usage)
 Denny Hill – regraded, now called the Denny Regrade
 Capitol Hill
 Queen Anne Hill
 Beacon Hill
The hills above were associated with seven boulders in the City of Seattle's Seven Hills Park.

Other hills people sometimes consider among the "seven hills of Seattle" include:
West Seattle – originally incorporated as a separate city, and not annexed by Seattle until 1907
 Magnolia
 Graham Hill
 Crown Hill – not annexed until 1954
Mount Baker

Geology
Seattle's topography is due largely to Pleistocene ice age glaciation. Nearly all of the city's seven hills are characterized as drumlins (Beacon Hill, First Hill, Capitol Hill, Queen Anne Hill, Mount Baker) or drift uplands (Magnolia, West Seattle).

"Seven Hills of Seattle" annual walk 
The Seattle-Bergen Sister City Association (Sister Cities International) sponsors an annual "Seven Hills of Seattle" walk. Seattle's sister city, Bergen, Norway, is known as the City of Seven Mountains.

See also
List of cities claimed to be built on seven hills
Seven hills of Rome - probably the origin of the romanticism of 'seven hills'.
History of Seattle before 1900

Notes

References

, narrated by Nick Zentner (Central Washington University Department of Geological Sciences). Uploaded March 2, 2015 by Hugefloods.com (Nick Zentner and Tom Foster: Discover the Ice Age Floods).

Landforms of Seattle
Hills of Washington (state)
Landforms of King County, Washington
Moraines of the United States